This is a list of 162 species in Psallus, a genus of plant bugs in the family Miridae.

Psallus species

 Psallus aethiops (Zetterstedt, 1840) i c g
 Psallus aetnicola Wagner, 1955 c g
 Psallus albicinctus (Kirschbaum, 1856) c g
 Psallus aldanensis Vinokurov, 1985 c g
 Psallus ambiguus (Fallén, 1807) c g
 Psallus amoenus Josifov, 1983 c g
 Psallus amygdali Linnavuori, 1998 c g
 Psallus anaemicus Seidenstucker, 1966 c g
 Psallus anatolicus Wagner, 1963 c g
 Psallus anticus (Reuter, 1876) c g
 Psallus apoplecticus Seidenstucker, 1966 c g
 Psallus argyrotrichus Fieber, 1861 c g
 Psallus asperus Van Duzee, 1923 i g
 Psallus assimilis Stichel, 1956 c g
 Psallus asthenicus Seidenstucker, 1966 c g
 Psallus ater Josifov, 1983 c g
 Psallus aterrimus Yasunaga and Vinokurov, 2000 c g
 Psallus atratus Josifov, 1983 c g
 Psallus aurora (Mulsant and Rey, 1852) c g
 Psallus bagjonicus Josifov, 1983 c g
 Psallus balcanicus Josifov, 1969 c g
 Psallus bernardi Wagner, 1958 c g
 Psallus betuleti (Fallén, 1829) i c g
 Psallus bivitreus (Mulsant and Rey, 1852) c g
 Psallus brachycerus Reuter, 1904 c g
 Psallus breviceps Reuter, 1909 i c g
 Psallus buddha Yasunaga, 2010 c g
 Psallus calliprinoi Carapezza, 2002 c g
 Psallus callunae Reuter, 1878 c g
 Psallus castaneae Josifov, 1983 c g
 Psallus catalanicus Wagner, 1965 c g
 Psallus cerridis Wagner, 1971 c g
 Psallus chrysopsilus Reuter, 1878 c g
 Psallus cinnabarinus Kerzhner, 1979 c g
 Psallus clarus Kerzhner, 1988 c g
 Psallus collaris (Wagner, 1975) c
 Psallus confusus Rieger, 1981 c g
 Psallus crataegi Kulik, 1973 c g
 Psallus criocoroides Reuter, 1879 c g
 Psallus cruentatus (Mulsant and Rey, 1852) c g
 Psallus cyprius Wagner, 1977 c g
 Psallus dichrous Kerzhner, 1962 c g
 Psallus difficilis Odhiambo, 1959 c g
 Psallus dilutipes Reuter, 1907 c g
 Psallus dilutus Fieber, 1858 c g
 Psallus divergens Reuter, 1899 c g
 Psallus drosopoulosi Linnavuori, 1992 c g
 Psallus edoensis Yasunaga and Vinokurov, 2000 c g
 Psallus ericetorum Reuter, 1899 c g
 Psallus ermolenkoi Kerzhner, 1979 c g
 Psallus ernesti Duwal & Lee, 2012 g
 Psallus eximius Reuter, 1904 c g
 Psallus fagi Drapolyuk, 1990 c g
 Psallus falleni Reuter, 1883 i c g b
 Psallus faniae Josifov, 1974 c g
 Psallus flavellus Stichel, 1933 i c g
 Psallus flavescens Kerzhner, 1988 c g
 Psallus flavipes (Reuter, 1899) c g
 Psallus fokkeri Reuter, 1899 c g
 Psallus fortis Li and Liu, 2007 c g
 Psallus fukienanus Zheng and H. Li., 1990 c g
 Psallus fuscatus Knight, 1923 i g
 Psallus fuscopunctatus Knight, 1930 i
 Psallus galilaeus Linnavuori, 1965 c g
 Psallus georgicus Zaitzeva, 1968 c g
 Psallus gidajatovi Drapolyuk, 1987 c g
 Psallus graminicola (Zetterstedt, 1828) c g
 Psallus guttatus Zheng and H. Li., 1990 c g
 Psallus haematodes (Gmelin, 1788) c g b
 Psallus halidi Drapolyuk, 1991 c g
 Psallus hani Zheng and H. Li., 1990 c g
 Psallus hartigi Wagner, 1970 c g
 Psallus hastatus Carapezza, 2002 c g
 Psallus helenae Josifov, 1969 c g
 Psallus henanensis Li and Liu, 2007 c g
 Psallus henschii Reuter, 1888 c g
 Psallus holomelas Reuter, 1906 c g
 Psallus injensis Duwal g
 Psallus jeitensis Wagner, 1963 c g
 Psallus jungaricus Vinokurov and Luo, 2012 c g
 Psallus jurorum Linnavuori, 1975 c g
 Psallus karakardes Seidenstucker, 1959 c g
 Psallus kerzhneri Josifov, 1992 c g
 Psallus kiritshenkoi Zaitzeva, 1968 c g
 Psallus koreanus Josifov, 1983 c g
 Psallus kurseongensis Distant, 1910 c g
 Psallus lapponicus Reuter, 1874 c g
 Psallus laricinus Vinokurov, 1982 c g
 Psallus laticeps Reuter, 1878 c g
 Psallus lentigo Seidenstucker, 1972 c g
 Psallus lepidus Fieber, 1858 i c g
 Psallus loginovae Kerzhner, 1988 c g
 Psallus lucanicus Wagner, 1968 c g
 Psallus luridus Reuter, 1878 c g
 Psallus luteicornis (Villers, 1789) c g
 Psallus maculosus Knight, 1925 i
 Psallus mali Zheng and H. Li., 1990 c g
 Psallus melpomene (Linnavuori, 1989) c g
 Psallus michaili Kerzhner and Schuh, 1995 c g
 Psallus milenae Josifov, 1974 c g
 Psallus minusculus Zaitzeva, 1968 c g
 Psallus miyamotoi Yasunaga and Vinokurov, 2000 c g
 Psallus mollis (Mulsant and Rey, 1852) c g
 Psallus montanus Josifov, 1973 c g
 Psallus nigricornis Yasunaga and Vinokurov, 2000 c g
 Psallus nigripilis (Reuter, 1888) c g
 Psallus ninurta (Linnavuori, 1984) c g
 Psallus nipponicus Vinokurov, 1998 c g
 Psallus ocularis (Mulsant and Rey, 1852) c g
 Psallus oenderi Wagner, 1976 c g
 Psallus oleae Wagner, 1963 c g
 Psallus orni Wagner, 1968 c g
 Psallus oyashimanus Yasunaga and Vinokurov, 2000 c g
 Psallus pardalis Seidenstucker, 1966 c g
 Psallus perrisi (Mulsant and Rey, 1852) c g
 Psallus piceae Reuter, 1878 c g
 Psallus pinicola Reuter, 1875 c g
 Psallus pseudoambiguus Wagner, 1970 c g
 Psallus pseudoplatani Reichling, 1984 c g
 Psallus pseudopunctulatus Linnavuori, 1984 c g
 Psallus pseudoquercus Josifov, 1974 c g
 Psallus pullus Yasunaga and Vinokurov, 2000 c g
 Psallus punctulatus Puton, 1874 c g
 Psallus quercicola (Reuter, 1904) c g
 Psallus quercus (Kirschbaum, 1856) c g
 Psallus roseoguttatus Yasunaga and Vinokurov, 2000 c g
 Psallus roseus (Fabricius, 1777) i
 Psallus rubinicterus Seidenstucker, 1966 c g
 Psallus rubromaculosus Knight, 1935 c g
 Psallus sachaensis Vinokurov, 1998 c g
 Psallus salicicola Schwartz and Kelton, 1990 i
 Psallus salicis (Kirschbaum, 1856) c g
 Psallus samdzijonicus Josifov, 1983 c g
 Psallus samedovi Drapolyuk, 1991 c g
 Psallus samoanus Knight, 1935 c g
 Psallus sanguinarius Kerzhner and Josifov, 1999 c g
 Psallus shulsangaricus Linnavuori, 2010 c g
 Psallus siculus Reuter, 1875 c g
 Psallus skylla Linnavuori, 1994 c g
 Psallus sorbi Wagner, 1970 c g
 Psallus stackelbergi Kerzhner, 1988 c g
 Psallus svidae Drapolyuk, 1991 c g
 Psallus syriacus (Reuter, 1883) c g
 Psallus taehwana Duwal g
 Psallus takaii Yasunaga and Vinokurov, 2000 c g
 Psallus tesongsanicus Josifov, 1983 c g
 Psallus tibialis Reuter, 1894 c g
 Psallus tonnaichanus Muramoto, 1973 c g
 Psallus transcaucasicus Zaitzeva, 1966 c g
 Psallus tristis (Blanchard, 1852) c g
 Psallus turcicus Wagner, 1971 c g
 Psallus ulmi Kerzhner and Josifov, 1966 c g
 Psallus ussuriensis Kerzhner, 1979 c g
 Psallus vaccinicola Knight, 1930 i
 Psallus variabilis (Fallén, 1807) i c g b
 Psallus varians (Herrich-Schaeffer, 1841) c g
 Psallus vicinus Reuter, 1899 c g
 Psallus vittatus (Fieber, 1861) c g
 Psallus wagneri Ossiannilsson, 1953 c g
 Psallus yasunagai Vinokurov, 1998 c g
 Psallus yongdaeri Duwal g
 Psallus zakatalensis Drapolyuk, 1991 c g

Data sources: i = ITIS, c = Catalogue of Life, g = GBIF, b = Bugguide.net

References

Psallus
Articles created by Qbugbot